The Henry Holland Buckman Bridge carries I-295 West Beltway traffic over the St. Johns River in Jacksonville, Florida. It was named for Henry Holland Buckman, a prominent legislator and attorney who was instrumental in establishing the Florida state road system.

History

Before the opening of the bridge (1970), road travel across the St. Johns River from Orange Park to Mandarin was longer and more complex. Another option was to drive south to Green Cove Springs and across the wooden planks of the Shands Bridge, almost twice the distance of the northern route.

The first public hearing about the bridge was held in July 1963. In April 1964, after intense discussion, the decision was made to place the bridge in Duval County, just north of the Clay County line. Construction began, but the first concrete pilings exploded days after they were poured. Investigation revealed that the heat generated from the curing concrete increased Anaerobic digestion by bacteria in the brackish water and generated methane gas. The engineers were forced to change their construction method.

Details

The eastbound (carrying I-295 South traffic) and westbound (carrying I-295 North traffic) lanes are built on separate bridge structures. Average daily traffic in 1996 was estimated at 78,000 vehicles. In 1995, the bridge was expanded from two lanes in each direction with partial breakdown lanes to four lanes in each direction with full breakdown lanes. A Florida Department of Transportation study in September 1997 counted 110,743 vehicles. Downtown Jacksonville and Naval Air Station Jacksonville are visible from the bridge to the north. On a clear day, the Seminole Electric power plant in Palatka can be seen to the south of the bridge.

Closings
While rarely closed for weather, two situations have made shutdown necessary: Tropical Storm Fay and prolonged freezing conditions. On December 23, 1989 the temperature dropped to 26° and precipitation changed from rain to sleet to snow, which lasted for several days. All the bridges in Jacksonville were impassable and closed for more than 24 hours, except for the original St. Elmo W. Acosta Bridge, which was first opened to traffic in 1921.

See also
 
 
 
 List of crossings of the St. Johns River

References

External links
Nautical Chart

Bridges completed in 1970
Bridges completed in 1995
Bridges in Jacksonville, Florida
Interstate 95
Road bridges in Florida
Bridges over the St. Johns River
Bridges on the Interstate Highway System
1970 establishments in Florida
Steel bridges in the United States
Girder bridges in the United States